Living It is the fifth studio album by Dorinda Clark-Cole. Light Records released the album on February 17, 2015. She worked with music producers, LaShawn Daniels, Courtney Harrell, Deon Kipping, Travis Malloy, Donnie McClurkin, Londell "Diezel" Robinson, Rick Robinson, Rodrick "Cliche" Simmons, Asaph Ward, Daniel Weatherspoon, Joe "Flip" Wilson, and Larry Wilson, in the production of this album. This album was nominated for a Grammy Award in the Best Gospel Album category at the 58th edition of the awards.

Track listing

Chart performance

References

2015 albums
Light Records albums